Carnmore is an electoral area located at the southern end of the parish of Claregalway, approximately  east of Galway city in County Galway, Ireland. Carnmore is in a Gaeltacht area, although the majority of residents use English as their first language. Incorporating the townlands of Carnmore, Carnmore West and Carnmore East, the area is represented in hurling competitions by Carnmore GAA. Galway Airport is also nearby.

History
There is also a lisheen, a small fort, in Carnmore where some local children (and adults) were buried. There are also several Dolmen-style (portal tomb) burial sites in the area. In Claregalway there is the Franciscan Friary, and the sites of five castles are located in the parish area: Claregalway, Cloghmoyle, Lydican, Lissarulla and Kiltrogue.

Demographics
According to the 2016 census there were 2,577 people living in the Carnmore Electoral Division, with only 2.2% of the population indicating that they spoke Irish on a daily basis outside the education system. As of 2015, there were 164 pupils enrolled in the local primary school, Carnmore National School.

Sport
Carnmore's hurling club, Carnmore GAA, was founded in 1944 – although hurling has been played in the parish since before the foundation of the GAA. The club fields teams in the Galway Intermediate Hurling Championship.

Notable residents 
 Máirtín Ó Cadhain was a school teacher in Carnmore in the 1930s.
 Colie McDonagh, All-Ireland Senior Football medallist in 1966

References

External links

Carnmore Irish stats

Towns and villages in County Galway